Ceadîr-Lunga Airport (ICAO: LUCL) is located in Ceadîr-Lunga, Gagauzia, Moldova, 3 km (1.85 mi) south-east of the city centre.

Airports in Moldova